Gemini Gymnastics is a high performance Canadian gymnastics club located in Oshawa, Ontario.  It was established in 1979 as a parent-run club. Head coach Yelena Davydova was the gold medallist in the women's artistic individual all-around at the 1980 Summer Olympics in Moscow, where she competed for the Soviet Union.

Honours
Gemini Gymnastics is one of the top gymnastics clubs in Canada. In 2012 it was awarded a Gold "Club of Excellence" Award by Gymnastics Canada, the highest award of its kind.  Gemini has won this award for 10 straight years, ever since the award's creation in 2003 and is only one of two clubs in Canada to have done so.

Gemini has produced champions in all levels of competitive gymnastics, including 15 Canadian AA Champions, 8 Elite Canada AA Champions, 21 Eastern Canadian AA Champions and 98 Ontario AA Champions and two Olympians.≥ Davydova was also named Ontario's Female Coach of the Year in 2012.

Olympics

In June 2012, Kristina Vaculik was named to the Canadian Olympic Women's Artistic Gymnastic's Team, and Elena was named as one of the team's coaches. On July 29, the Canadian team made team finals, the first Canadian gymnastics team to make a team final in a non-boycotted year. On July 31, the team came 5th in the women's artistic team all-around finals, behind the United States, Russia, Romania, and China. In July 2021 Ava Stewart competed at the 2020 Tokyo Olympics.

References

Gymnastics organizations
Gymnastics clubs
1979 establishments in Ontario